Siliput, a.k.a. Maimai, is a Torricelli language of Papua New Guinea. It is spoken in Seleput village, Mawase Rural LLG, Sandaun Province.

External links 
 Paradisec has a number of collections that include Siliput language materials.

References

Maimai languages
Languages of Sandaun Province